Protein AF-10 is a protein that in humans is encoded by the MLLT10 gene.

Interactions 

MLLT10 has been shown to interact with SS18.

References

Further reading